The 2021 Georgian Cup is a single elimination association football tournament which began on 21 March 2021. The winner of this season's cup will earn a spot in the first qualifying round of the UEFA Europa Conference League.

Gagra are the defending cup champions after winning the final in the previous season against Samgurali on penalties.

First round 
Twenty-four first round matches were played on 21–23 March 2021.

|}

Second round 
Twelve second round matches were played on 26–27 March 2021.

|}

Third round 
Sixteen third round matches were played on 18–21 April 2021.

|}

Fourth round 
Eight fourth round matches were played on 19–20 May 2021.

|}

Quarterfinals 
The quarterfinals were played on 28 October 2021.

|}

Semifinals 
The semifinals were played on 24 November 2021.

|}

Final 
The final was played on 8 December 2021.

See also 
 2021 Erovnuli Liga

References

External links
 Official site 

Georgian Cup seasons
Georgian Cup
Cup